KBBZ (98.5 FM, "B98.5") is a commercial radio station in Kalispell, Montana, broadcasting to the Kalispell-Flathead Valley, Montana, area. KBBZ airs a classic rock music format.

It is owned by Bee Broadcasting, Inc. All Bee Broadcasting stations are based at 2431 Highway 2 East, Kalispell.

External links
KBBZ official website

BBZ
Classic rock radio stations in the United States
Radio stations established in 1983
1983 establishments in Montana